Cotmeana is a commune in Argeș County, Muntenia, Romania. It is composed of fourteen villages: Bascovele, Bunești, Costești, Cotmeana, Dealu Pădurii, Drăgolești, Lintești, Negești, Pielești, Săndulești, Spiridoni, Ursoaia, Vârloveni and Zamfirești.

References

Communes in Argeș County
Localities in Muntenia